Atlantic and Gulf Railroad may refer to:
Atlantic and Gulf Railroad (1856–79), predecessor of the Atlantic Coast Line Railroad
Atlantic and Gulf Railroad (1991–99), Gulf and Ohio Railways subsidiary